Slamet is an Indonesian name that may refer to
Given name
Slamet Abdul Sjukur (1935–2015), Indonesian composer
Slamet Gundono (1966–2014), Indonesian puppeteer and artist
Slamet Nurcahyono (born 1983), Indonesian footballer
Slamet Rahardjo (born 1949), Indonesian actor, director, and screenwriter
Slamet Rijadi (1927–1950), Indonesian soldier
Slamet Riyadi (footballer) (born 1981), Indonesian footballer

Surname
Bing Slamet (1927–1974), Indonesian singer, songwriter, comedian, and actor
Winarni Binti Slamet (born 1975), Indonesian weightlifter

See also
 Mount Slamet in Indonesia

Indonesian-language surnames